Keith Alan Self (born March 20, 1953) is an American politician and former county judge who is the United States representative for Texas's 3rd congressional district.

Early life and education 
Self was born in 1953 at a military hospital in Philadelphia and graduated from Tascosa High School in Amarillo, Texas. He earned a Bachelor of Science degree in engineering from the United States Military Academy in 1975.

Career 
Self served in the United States Army from 1975 to 1999. He was a member of the Army Special Forces and Army Rangers. He was deployed to Qatar, Egypt, Germany, Afghanistan, and Belgium. Self later served as the county judge for Collin County, Texas. He was a candidate for Texas's 3rd congressional district in the March 2022 Republican primary, finishing second to incumbent Van Taylor and advancing to a May runoff. After the primary, Taylor announced that he would end his congressional campaign amid accusations of infidelity, giving Self the nomination. Self won the November general election.

Tenure 
	
On January 3, 2023, at the beginning of the 118th Congress, Self voted for Jim Jordan and later for Byron Donalds to be the U.S. House Speaker, in rebuke of House Minority Leader Kevin McCarthy. "I love the new [U.S. House] rules. I’m looking for somebody that will enforce them", Self said. In the 12th round of voting, Self changed his vote to McCarthy, saying "we are making progress... This will change this House, let’s be very clear". Self was one of 15 Republicans to change their votes. McCarthy finally won the speakership on the 15th vote, held early in the morning on Saturday, January 7, with Self voting in favor.

As a consequence of the delay in selecting a new speaker, Self was formally sworn in as a member of the House of Representatives in the early morning of January 7, 2023, despite the 118th Congress convening on January 3.

Political positions

Fiscal policy
Self has said that he considers the growth of U.S. national debt "the existential threat that our nation faces today".

Notes

References

External links
 Congressman Keith Self official U.S. House website
 Keith Self for Congress campaign website
 
 

|-

1953 births
County judges in Texas
Living people
Members of the United States Army Special Forces
People from Amarillo, Texas
Republican Party members of the United States House of Representatives from Texas
Texas Republicans
United States Army officers
United States Military Academy alumni
University of Southern California alumni